Rubberslime is a supergroup that is mostly composed of members from the punk bands Slime and Rubbermaids.

The five Hamburg natives founded this band for the occasion of a solidarity concert for FC St. Pauli. They played a mix of Slime and Rubbermaids classics, as well as new songs. In November 2005, their frontman Dirk Jora left the band for personal reasons. Since then, Elf and Minne have become the main singers and the band has no intentions on hiring a replacement.

Discography 
 2003 - Viva St. Pauli (single)
 2004 - First Attack (album)
 2005 - Rock'n'Roll Genossen (album)

References 
 Hiller, Joachim. "Interviews & Artikel : RUBBERSLIME :: Ox-fanzine.de." Ox-Fanzine, June–July 2005. Web. 5 March 2016.

External links 
 Slime Official Website
 Official Rubberslime/Elf MySpace Website

German punk rock groups
Musical groups from Hamburg